Yavuz Aygün (born 27 June 1996) is a Turkish professional football player who plays as a goalkeeper for TFF Second League club Isparta 32 Spor.

Professional career
Yavuz made his professional debut for Trabzonspor in a 6-0 Süper Lig loss to Kasımpaşa S.K. on 19 May 2016.

References

External links
 
 
 

1996 births
People from Arsin, Turkey
Living people
Turkish footballers
Association football goalkeepers
Trabzonspor footballers
Göztepe S.K. footballers
Boluspor footballers
Fatih Karagümrük S.K. footballers
Süper Lig players
TFF First League players
TFF Second League players
TFF Third League players